List of rivers flowing in the island of Sumbawa, Indonesia.

In alphabetical order

See also
 List of rivers of Indonesia
 List of rivers of Lesser Sunda Islands

References

 
Lists of rivers